The following is a list of the 433 communes of the Aude department of France.

The communes cooperate in the following intercommunalities (as of 2020):
Communauté d'agglomération Carcassonne Agglo
Communauté d'agglomération Le Grand Narbonne
Communauté de communes Castelnaudary Lauragais Audois
Communauté de communes Corbières Salanque Méditerranée (partly)
Communauté de communes Lauragais Revel Sorezois (partly)
Communauté de communes du Limouxin
Communauté de communes de la Montagne Noire
Communauté de communes Piège-Lauragais-Malepère
Communauté de communes des Pyrénées Audoises
Communauté de communes Région Lézignanaise, Corbières et Minervois

References

Aude